A seagull is a colloquial term often used to refer to a gull, a sea bird in the family Laridae.

Seagull or Sea Gull may also refer to:

Businesses
 Sea-Gull, a Chinese watch company
 Seagull Book, an American retail chain bookstore focusing on products for Mormons
 Seagull Camera, a Chinese camera company
 Seagull Guitars, a Canadian guitar company
 Seagull Semiconductor, a computer networking company
 British Seagull, a manufacturer of outboard engines

Arts and Entertainment
 The Seagull, an 1896 play by Anton Chekhov
 The Seagull (1959 film), an Australian film
 The Sea Gull, a 1968 drama film
 The Seagull (1970 film)
 The Seagull (2018 film), a 2018 American film
 A Woman of the Sea or Sea Gulls, a 1926 silent film
 The Seagull (theatre), a theatre in Pakefield, Lowestoft, Suffolk, UK
 The Seagull, a crime mystery novel in the Vera Stanhope series written by Ann Cleeves.
 The Seagull, the novel's adapted episode of the TV show Vera based on the book series.

Music
 The Seagull (opera), an opera by Thomas Pasatieri
 Seagulls, an album by Hap Palmer
 Steve 'N' Seagulls, a Finnish country band

Songs
 "Seagull", a song by Bad Company from Bad Company
 "Seagull", a song by Bill Callahan from Dream River
 "Seagull". a 1976 song by Rainbow Cottage
 "Seagull", a 1981 song by Kayak
 "Seagull", a song by Ride from Nowhere
 "Seagull", a song by Shout Out Louds from Howl Howl Gaff Gaff
 "Seagull", a song by Steeleye Span from Tempted and Tried

Military
 Operation Seagull, a British military action to destroy several Nazi targets
 Operation Seagull (Ireland), a German military operation to infiltrate England

Places
 Seagull Island (Tiwi Islands), Northern Territory, Australia
 Seagull Rock, small islet off south-eastern Tasmania, Australia

Sports
 Brighton & Hove Albion F.C. or the Seagulls, an English football club
 Gold Coast Seagulls, an Australian rugby league team
 Helsinki Seagulls, a Finnish basketball team
 Runaway Bay Seagulls, an Australian Rugby League club
 MSIT Seagulls, the sports teams of Staten Island Technical High School

Transportation

Aviation
 Flygfabriken LN-3 Seagull, an amphibian kitplane produced in Sweden
 SOC Seagull, a biplane aircraft designed for the United States Navy, first produced in 1937
 Supermarine Seagull (1921), a 1920s British flying boat
 Supermarine Seagull (1948), an unrelated flying boat design, of which just two were built in the late 1940s
 Supermarine Walrus or Supermarine Seagull V, a British Walrus flying boat that operated during World War II

Maritime
 Sea Gull (skipjack), a historic fishing vessel
 Bell Seagull, a type of sailing boat
 HMS Seagull (1795), a 16-gun brig-sloop
 HMS Seagull (1805),a 16-gun Seagull-class brig-sloop
 HMS Seagull (1808), a 16-gun brig-sloop
 HMS Seagull (1889), a Sharpshooter-class torpedo gunboat converted to a minesweeper
 HMS Seagull (J85), a Halcyon-class minesweeper launched in 1937
 USS Sea Gull (1818), a steamer
 USS Sea Gull (1838), a survey ship
 USS Sea Gull (SP-223), a patrol vessel in commission from 1917 to 1918
 USS Sea Gull (SP-544), a patrol vessel in commission from 1917 to 1918
 USS Seagull (AM-30), a minesweeper laid down in 1918
 USS Seagull (AMS-55), a minesweeper laid down as YMS-402 in 1942

Rail
 LNER Class A4 4902 Seagull, a British LNER Class A4 steam locomotive
 Furness Railway K1 or Seagull, a type of locomotive

Road
 Seagull intersection, a three-way atgrade intersection type

Other uses
 "The Seagull" (poem), a poem by Dafydd ap Gwilym
 Seagull (gamer) or Brandon Larned, American video game streamer and retired professional Overwatch player
 Seagull manager, a manager who uses a type of poor management style
 Seagull Monument, a monument in Salt Lake City, Utah, US
 Seagull, a diacritic used in transcribing linguolabial consonants in the International Phonetic Alphabet
 'Seagull', a climbing rose by Pritchard in 1907.

People with the surname
 Bobby Seagull, British television personality

See also
 A Flock of Seagulls, a British band
 Gabbiano (disambiguation)
 Gull (disambiguation)
 HMS Seagull, a list of ships of the Royal Navy
 Jonathan Livingston Seagull, a novel by Richard Bach
 Sea eagle
 Segal
 USS Sea Gull, a list of United States Navy ships
 USS Seagull, a list of ships of the United States Navy